The Open For The Ages is a special made-for-television fictional edition of The Open Championship tournament of golf. Utilizing data analysis, a fan vote and 50 years of Open archive footage, it features 21 famous golfers including previous Open champions from various eras at the peak of their careers competing on the Old Course at St Andrews for the Claret Jug and the title of Champion Golfer. The event aired from 16-19 July 2020 – the same dates that the 2020 Open Championship was supposed to be held at Royal St George's Golf Club before being canceled by the global COVID-19 pandemic, which further led the tournament organizers to create the event. 

Nick Dougherty, Ewen Murray and Iona Stephen provided commentary, with highlight videos being released for the first three rounds and the full final round being broadcast on Sunday, including on Sky Sports in the United Kingdom and the Golf Channel on NBC in the United States.

Course

Entrants
The 21 players chosen were all major champions, with all but two having been named Champion Golfer of the Year at least once. Between them, they had won 107 major championships including 43 Open Championships in seven different decades. They represented nine countries between them and included the major championship victory record holder in Jack Nicklaus (18) and the last man to hold all four major championships at once in Tiger Woods (2000 U.S. Open, 2000 Open Championship, 2000 PGA Championship and 2001 Masters), as well as three career Grand Slam winners in Gary Player, Nicklaus and Woods.

In chronological order of first achieving best Open Championship result

Final leaderboard
The winner was determined by a fan vote registering more than 10,000 responses, and a data model developed in partnership  with regular Open Championship sponsor NTT Data utilizing the fan vote along with player career statistics and historical data from The Open to calculate who would win the Claret Jug during this dream event. Added weight was given to performance at St Andrews.

Jack Nicklaus, who was judged the Champion Golfer over runner-up Tiger Woods by a single shot, said, 
Asked about how such a clash of eras might be in real life with each player at his best, he said, 

The final leaderboard ran thus:

References

External links
The Open For The Ages (Official site)
The Open For The Ages on YouTube
Full Final Round Broadcast (YouTube)

The Open Championship
Golf on television